The 2000–01 Algerian Cup was the 36th edition of the Algerian Cup. USM Alger won the Cup by defeating CR Méchria 1–0. It was USM Alger fifth  Algerian Cup in its history.

Round of 64

Round of 32

Round of 16

Quarter-finals

Semi-finals

Final

Champions

References

 

Algerian Cup
Algerian Cup
Algerian Cup